San Francisco High School is a high school in Lamut, Ifugao, Philippines.

References

Schools in Ifugao
High schools in the Philippines